Ewa Villages is a census-designated place (CDP) located in the Ewa District and the City & County of Honolulu on the leeward side of Oahu in Hawaii approximately  from downtown Honolulu.  As of the 2020 census, the CDP had a population of 7,825.

This area was previously known as Ewa (in Hawaiian, ewa means "crooked"). In the late 19th century to early 20th century, Ewa was one of the large population centers on the island of Oahu, with industry focused around sugar cane production.  The Ewa Mill was a major employer that set up residential villages within Ewa (from which the modern name arose).  Sugar cane is no longer grown on the Ewa Plain and Ewa is now one of Oahu's suburban growth centers—an area of substantial sprawl spreading unbroken to Ewa Gentry and Ewa Beach on the south, Kalaeloa on the southwest, and Kapolei on the west.  This area is now referred to as Oahu's Second City, with a city center (downtown) located in Kapolei.

Honouliuli is a former village and now a place name for the north end of Ewa, lying along Honouliuli Stream between Ewa Villages and Waipahu.

The U.S. postal code for Ewa is 96706, the same as  Ewa Beach.

Geography 
Ewa Villages is located at  (21.342155, -158.041679), inland from Ewa Beach along the main thoroughfare of State Rte. 76 (Fort Weaver Road).  This highway runs north past Honouliuli to Waipahu, connecting there to Farrington Highway and the H-1 freeway. The main east–west thoroughfare in Ewa Villages is Renton Road which connects to Kalaeloa and Kapolei to the west.  Eventually, the Kapolei Parkway will replace Renton Road as the main east–west thoroughfare for the Second City south of H-1 and Farrington Highway.

Ewa is a widely used directional term on Oahu, referring to the direction of the town of Ewa but meaning westward to those residing and working in Honolulu.  Its opposite is "Diamond Head" (located at the east end of Waikīkī) or "Koko Head" (located still further east of downtown Honolulu).

Honouliuli Internment Camp, a World War II–era internment camp, operated there from 1943 to 1945.

Demographics 

As of the census of 2000, there were 4,741 people, 1,178 households, and 1,003 families residing in the CDP. The racial makeup of the CDP was 3.50% White, 0.30% African American, 0.11% Native American, 70.43% Asian, 4.64% Pacific Islander, 0.76% from other races, and 20.27% from two or more races.  8.80% of the population were Hispanic or Latino of any race.

There were 1,178 households, out of which 39.6% had children under the age of 18 living with them, 63.8% were married couples living together, 12.9% had a female householder with no husband present, and 14.8% were non-families. 11.5% of all households were made up of individuals, and 7.8% had someone living alone who was 65 years of age or older.  The average household size was 4.02 and the average family size was 4.33.

In the CDP the population was spread out, with 27.8% under the age of 18, 9.4% from 18 to 24, 30.2% from 25 to 44, 18.8% from 45 to 64, and 13.8% who were 65 years of age or older.  The median age was 33 years.  For every 100 females there were 102.0 males.  For every 100 females age 18 and over, there were 100.3 males.

The median income for a household in the CDP was $51,451, and the median income for a family was $52,878. Males had a median income of $28,281 versus $21,491 for females. The per capita income for the CDP was $12,883.  About 6.7% of families and 8.6% of the population were below the poverty line, including 10.3% of those under the age of 18 and 16.5% of those 65 and older.

Government and infrastructure 
The United States Postal Service operates the Ewa Station Post Office in Ewa Villages.

Education 
Hawaii Department of Education operates public schools. Ewa Elementary School is in the Ewa Villages CDP.

Lanakila Baptist School's middle and high school division is in the CDP.

References 

Census-designated places in Honolulu County, Hawaii